Mesogona subcuprea is a moth of the family Noctuidae. It is found in Washington, Oregon and California.

The length of the forewings is 19–21 mm. Adults are on wing from August to October.

Larvae have been reared on Quercus agrifolia and Quercus dumosa.

External links
Bug Guide
A revision of Mesogona Boisduval (Lepidoptera: Noctuidae)for North America with descriptions of two new species
Images

Xyleninae
Moths of North America